Ng Poon Chew (March 14, 1866 – March 13, 1931) was an author, publisher, and advocate for Chinese American civil rights. He published the first Chinese-language daily newspaper to be printed outside of China.

Born in the Toisan district of Guangdong province in Southern China, Ng moved to California in 1881, where he first worked as a domestic servant on a ranch. He became a student of U.S. culture, studying English, adopting Western dress, and converting to Christianity. He joined the seminary and in 1892 became the first Chinese Presbyterian Minister on the American West Coast. He was assigned to a ministry in Los Angeles, but after a fire destroyed his mission, he decided to focus his efforts on establishing a Chinese-language newspaper instead. After a year of publishing his L.A.-based weekly, Hua Mei Sun Bo, Ng moved to San Francisco, where he wrote the first Chinese-language daily outside of China: Chung Sai Yat Pao. His newspaper generally promoted an assimilationist viewpoint, encouraging Chinese American readers to adapt to North American values.

Ng traveled the country speaking out against anti-Chinese legislation, such as the Chinese Exclusion Act. He also 
published books and pamphlets opposing discrimination against Chinese Americans.

Ng was adviser to the Chinese consulate general in San Francisco from 1906 to 1913 and vice-consul for China from 1913 until 1931.

He was called "an Oriental Mark Twain".

See also

King Lan Chew, Ng Poon Chew's youngest daughter, a dancer.
John P. Irish, supported Chinese immigration. Ng Poon Chew was an honorary pallbearer at his funeral.
 Samantha Knox Condit, Presbyterian missionary in San Francisco. Ng Poon Chew was an assisting pastor at her funeral.

Notes

1866 births
1931 deaths
Chinese Christians
Converts to Christianity
Chinese emigrants to the United States
American Presbyterian ministers
American male journalists
American male non-fiction writers
20th-century American journalists
20th-century American non-fiction writers
20th-century American male writers
People from Taishan, Guangdong
Journalists from California
Religious leaders from California
20th-century Presbyterian ministers
20th-century American clergy